Bambers, also known as Poznań Bambergians, are Poles who are partly descended from Germans who moved from the area of Bamberg (Upper Franconia, Germany) to villages surrounding Poznań, Poland. They settled in villages which had been destroyed during the Great Northern War and the subsequent epidemic of cholera, including: 
 1719 in Luboń
 1730 in Dębiec, Jeżyce, Winiary and Bonin
 1746–1747 in Rataje and Wilda
 1750–1753 in Jeżyce and Górczyn

The condition for settlement was, according to the order of King Augustus II of 1710, all newly arrived foreign settlers in Polish–Lithuanian Commonwealth had to be Catholic. At least 450 to 500 men and women came to Poland according to surviving contracts, however, later documents suggest this number may have been as high as 900 people in four waves of immigration.

The integration of the group was voluntary and happened within one to two generations. The settlers' children learned the Polish language. There were also many mixed marriages with Poles living in the area. At the end of the 19th century, during the Prussian fight against the influence of the Catholic church, all Catholics in villages inhabited by the settlers chose Polish nationality during Prussian and German censuses.

In the late 19th century, the meaning of the word "Bamber" (singular form) became wider - it started to denote all people living in those villages, regardless of their ethnic or cultural background. Many of them were soldiers of the Polish army fighting in the Great Poland Uprising. During the German occupation of Poland most of them, like most Poles, were persecuted for their Polish identity. After World War II, for some time they were suspected of collaboration with the Germans.

A well known aspect of Bamber culture are its extravagant female dresses.

Notes

External links 
 Official site of Bambrzy (in Polish)
 Site of Towarzystwo Bambrow Poznanskich (The Society of Bambrzy) (in Polish)

Luboń
Ethnic groups in Poland
German diaspora in Poland
Poznań